The women's 800 metres at the 1971 European Athletics Championships was held in Helsinki, Finland, at Helsinki Olympic Stadium on 10, 11, and 12 August 1971.

Medalists

Results

Final
12 August

Semi-finals
11 August

Semi-final 1

Semi-final 2

Heats
10 August

Heat 1

Heat 2

Heat 3

Heat 4

Participation
According to an unofficial count, 23 athletes from 14 countries participated in the event.

 (2)
 (2)
 (2)
 (1)
 (1)
 (2)
 (1)
 (2)
 (1)
 (1)
 (1)
 (3)
 (3)
 (1)

References

800 metres
800 metres at the European Athletics Championships
1971 in women's athletics